Curtis 'Snowball' McHenry (April 4, 1899 – July 24, 1934) was an American stuntman and comedian, who appeared in Larry Semon comedies in the 1920s.

Early life
McHenry was born in Ruston, Louisiana on April 4, 1899, according to his World War I draft card. However, his death certificate said he was born on "April 4, 1900".

With Larry Semon
He appeared in several Larry Semon films like Lightning Love (1923) and Kid Speed (1924). But, sometimes has been misidentified with Spencer Bell. His best known role is as Snowball in The Wizard of Oz, who spends much of the film in a lion costume and running away from things.

Partial filmography
Pocahontas and John Smith (1924)
Robinson Crusoe (1924)
The Wizard of Oz (1925)
Stop, Look and Listen (1926)
The Lyin' Tamer (1926)
The Great K & A Train Robbery (1926)
Isle of Sunken Gold (1927)
Goofy Ghosts (1928)

References

External links

1899 births
1934 deaths
20th-century American male actors
People from Ruston, Louisiana
African-American male actors
American male film actors
American male silent film actors
United States Army personnel of World War I
Male actors from Louisiana
Silent film comedians
United States Army soldiers
20th-century American comedians
American male comedy actors
Deaths by stabbing in California
20th-century African-American people